Beard Motorsports is an American professional stock car racing team that competes part-time in the NASCAR Cup Series with the No. 62 Chevrolet Camaro ZL1 1LE for Austin Hill. The team was created in 2009 by Mark Beard for competition in the ARCA Menards Series. Beard Motorsports attempted two races in the Cup Series in 2014, with driver Clay Rogers, making none. After going dormant in 2015 and 2016, the team returned part-time in 2017 with Brendan Gaughan.

History

Early years
During his driving career, Mark Beard raced for his own team in ARCA and the NASCAR Busch Series as an owner-driver, but also fielded cars in the 1990s for drivers like Gary Neice, Dana Patten, Bobby Dotter, L. D. Ottinger, Richard Lasater, Butch Miller, and Jim Brinkley Jr. The owner of the oil business Beard Oil, he founded Beard Motorsports in 2009 and began racing in ARCA with Clay Rogers; Beard acquired equipment from Hendrick Motorsports. The team split time between the numbers 42 and 45 and scored a best finish of fourth at Iowa Speedway.

Cup Series

Mark Beard founded the team during the 2014 NASCAR Sprint Cup Series. The race team's engine was built with old Hendrick Motorsports parts and with tests at various east coast tracks, including at New Hampshire Motor Speedway.

The team was on the entry list for the July race at Loudon but withdrew their car before attempting to qualify. The team then attempted to run at Richmond International Raceway two months later with Clay Rogers in the No. 75 Beard Oil Chevrolet; however, they failed to qualify for the race. The last time Beard Motorsports attempted to qualify for a race was at Phoenix International Raceway with Rogers, but weren't able to make the race.

The team did not attempt any races in 2015 or 2016.

In 2017, Beard Motorsports announced it would run the Daytona 500 with Brendan Gaughan in the No. 75 Beard Oil Chevrolet. Gaughan's Richard Childress Racing Xfinity Series pit crew serviced the car and the team used a Childress engine. The team also bought a car from Leavine Family Racing, a Childress satellite; the car had finished 15th in the previous year's Daytona 500 with Michael McDowell. The team does not possess a NASCAR charter. As one of the two fastest non-charter cars in qualifying, Gaughan was able to make the field.

Gaughan then secured an 11th-place finish in the Daytona 500, the first race in the Cup Series for the team. The team announced it would enter the other three 2017 restrictor plate races. Gaughan and the team returned at Talladega, finishing 27th. Then on July 1 in the Coke Zero 400, Brendan Gaughan drove the team's car to a seventh-place finish, despite hitting the wall once in the race. The team's next race was the Alabama 500 at Talladega Superspeedway. Gaughan led laps and ended up 17th after avoiding the big one then being collected in the next crash.

The team came back for the 2018 slate of restrictor-plate races, and did the same as well in 2019, using cars from Richard Childress Racing, engines from ECR Engines, and technical support from the Childress crew.

2020 marked Gaughan's final season as a driver. He made the field at the 2020 Daytona 500 by posting the second fastest qualifying speed of all the non-charter teams (188.945 mph; 33rd overall). Gaughan's tenure with the team and career ended in the YellaWood 500 at Talladega, where he finished 35th after being collected in a Stage 2 wreck.

On January 14, 2021, Beard announced Noah Gragson would attempt to make his Cup debut in the Daytona 500. On January 31, just 14 days before the 500, team owner Mark Beard died at age 72.

On September 7, 2021, Beard Motorsports announced they will return in the 2022 season, entering the No. 62 in all four superspeedway races with Gragson competing in the 2022 Daytona 500. Gragson finally made his debut, but he failed to finish being involved in a crash. He achieved sponsorship from Wendy's for Talladega and achieved his first ever top-20 finish in a Cup Series race. Later on, at the August Daytona Race, Gragson finished fifth in the race, giving the team their first top 5 in a NASCAR Cup Series race.

Beard Motorsports attempted to make the 2023 Daytona 500 with Austin Hill, but Hill failed to make the field after a late crash resulted in an 18th place finish in Duel 2 of the 2023 Bluegreen Vacations Duels.

Car No. 62 results

Car No. 75 results

Daytona 500

References

External links
 

NASCAR teams
Iredell County, North Carolina
American auto racing teams
Auto racing teams established in 2009